Pichaqani (Aymara pichaqa, phichaqa, piqacha a big needle, -ni a suffix to indicate ownership, "the one with a big needle", Hispanicized spelling Pichacane) is a mountain in the Andes of Peru, about  high. It is situated in the Puno Region, Lampa Province, Ocuviri District. Pichaqani lies north of the lakes Ananta and Suyt'uqucha and west of the mountains Qillqa and Machu Kunturi.

References 

Mountains of Puno Region
Mountains of Peru